The Pylos Combat Agate is a Minoan sealstone of the Mycenaean era, likely manufactured in Late Minoan Crete. It depicts two warriors engaged in hand-to-hand combat, with a third warrior lying on the ground. It was discovered in the Griffin Warrior Tomb near the Palace of Nestor in Pylos and is dated to about 1450 BCE. The seal has come to be known as Pylos Combat Agate.

The seal is noted for its exceptionally fine and elaborate engraving, and considered "the single best work of glyptic art ever recovered from the Aegean Bronze Age". The quality of the work anticipates later developments as far ahead as the Classical era of a millennium later.

Background 

The Pylos Combat Agate was discovered by a University of Cincinnati archaeological team directed by Sharon Stocker and Jack Davis in the Griffin Warrior Tomb near modern-day Pylos. It consists of an amygdaloid (almond-shaped) sealstone of banded agate, with gold caps, measuring 3.6 cm in length (1.4 in) and was found alongside four gold signet rings.

Though the site was discovered in 2015, the agate, then covered in limestone, would not be revealed until 2017 as other finds from the site were published first. Afterwards, the agate underwent conservation and study for a year. Prior to conservation, the stone was believed to be a bead due to its small scale. Due to a longstanding consensus that Mycenaean civilizations imported or stole riches from Minoan Crete, it is believed that the seal was created in Crete. The fact that the stone was found in a Mycenaean tomb in mainland Greece is suggestive of cultural exchange between the Minoan and Mycenaean civilizations.

Subject matter 

The seal portrays a warrior who, having already defeated one opponent sprawled at his feet, is plunging his sword into the exposed neck of another foe holding a "figure-of-eight" shield, while at the same time grabbing the crest of the man's helmet. The scene strikingly resembles the one depicted on the gold cushion seal from Shaft Grave III in Grave Circle A in Mycenae (and is similar to  other Late Bronze Age signets or seals, such as the "Battle of the Glen" gold signet from the Shaft Grave IV at Mycenae). It is believed that all these objects were modeled after a well-known prototype, perhaps a wall painting, as it had already been suggested for other Early Mycenaean works of glyptic art; this view is partly shared  by the discoverers, who otherwise see an intentional parallel between the winning hero in the sealstone and the person who was buried with it, also in view of the correspondence between his arms and ornaments (e.g., a necklace and a sealstone) and objects that are also found in the grave, close to the body.

Impact 
In 2016, the Greek Culture Ministry referred to this excavation as the most significant discovery in continental Greece in the last 65 years. The small scale of the intricate details prompted questions regarding ancient Greek civilizations' ability to create such an object; some archaeologists believe that such minute details could have only been created with the help of a magnifying glass, though none dating from the stone's period have been found on the island of Crete.

Its co-discoverer Davis refers to the piece as "incomprehensibly small", remarking that works of art with as much detail would not be seen "for another thousand years." He also added: “It seems that the Minoans were producing art of the sort that no one ever imagined they were capable of producing. It's a spectacular find." Researchers have asserted that this discovery challenges previously established consensuses regarding the artistic development of the Minoan civilization. The agate's researchers state that this discovery necessitates a reevaluation of the time-line on which Greek art developed. While dated as belonging to the Aegean Bronze Age, Davis notes that it bears more resemblance to Classical period art, which developed a millennium later, due to the breadth of anatomical knowledge embodied in the stone's engravings.

See also 

 Ancient Greek art
 Arkalochori Axe
 Minoan Bull-leaper
 Minoan snake goddess figurines
 Phaistos Disc

References

External links
 Unearthing a masterpiece - University of Cincinnati
 Photograph of the Pylos Combat Agate

15th-century BC works
2017 archaeological discoveries
Minoan archaeological artifacts
Archaeological sources on Greek mythology
Aegean art of the Bronze Age
Seals (insignia)
Individual hardstone carvings
Pylos
Minoan art
Individual items of jewellery